The 1990 Knowsley South by-election was a by-election held on 27 September 1990 for the British House of Commons constituency of Knowsley South in Merseyside.

The by-election was caused by the death of the constituency's  Labour Party Member of Parliament (MP) Sean Hughes on 25 June.

The result was a Labour hold, with Edward O'Hara winning a majority of over 11,000 votes.

Votes

References

See also 
 List of United Kingdom by-elections
 Knowsley South constituency

Knowsley South by-election
Knowsley South by-election
Knowsley South by-election
1990s in Merseyside
Politics of the Metropolitan Borough of Knowsley
By-elections to the Parliament of the United Kingdom in Merseyside constituencies